Canterbury High School can refer to:

Canada 
Canterbury High School (New Brunswick)
Canterbury High School (Ottawa)

United Kingdom 
The Canterbury Academy, Canterbury, Kent, formerly the Canterbury High School

United States 
Canterbury School (Connecticut)
Canterbury School (Fort Wayne, Indiana)
Canterbury High School (Accokeek, Maryland)

See also 
Canterbury School (disambiguation)